Petrovice is a municipality and village in Příbram District in the Central Bohemian Region of the Czech Republic. It has about 1,300 inhabitants.

Administrative parts
Villages of Brod, Kojetín, Krchov, Kuní, Kuníček, Mašov, Mezihoří, Obděnice, Ohrada, Porešín, Radešice, Radešín, Skoupý, Týnčany, Vilasova Lhota, Zahrádka and Žemličkova Lhota are administrative parts of Petrovice.

Notable people
Jan Josef Švagr (1885–1969), architect

Gallery

References

Villages in Příbram District